Chrysopilus tomentosus is a species of snipe flies in the family Rhagionidae.

Distribustion
United States

References

Rhagionidae
Diptera of North America
Insects described in 1887
Taxa named by Jacques-Marie-Frangile Bigot